Ethnic cleansing of Georgians in South Ossetia was a mass expulsion of ethnic Georgians conducted in South Ossetia and other territories occupied by Russian and South Ossetian forces, which happened during and after the 2008 Russia–Georgia war. Overall, at least 20,000 Georgians were forcibly displaced from South Ossetia.

The Human Rights Watch concluded that the "South Ossetian forces sought to ethnically cleanse" the Georgian-populated areas. In 2009, the Parliamentary Assembly of the Council of Europe resolutions condemned "the ethnic cleansing and other human rights violations in South Ossetia, as well as the failure of Russia and the de facto authorities to bring these practices to a halt and their perpetrators to justice". According to the September 2009 report of the European Union-sponsored Independent International Fact-Finding Mission on the Conflict in Georgia, "several elements suggest the conclusion that ethnic cleansing was carried out against ethnic Georgians in South Ossetia both during and after the August 2008 conflict."

Of the 192,000 people displaced in the 2008 war, 127,000 were displaced in Georgia proper, 30,000 within South Ossetia, and another 35,000 fled to North Ossetia. According to the 2016 census conducted by the South Ossetian authorities, 3,966 ethnic Georgians remained in the breakaway territory, constituting 7% of the region's total population of 53,532.

1991–92 South Ossetia War

Between 1989 and 1992, fighting flared in the South Ossetian A.O. and in Georgia proper between ethnic Ossetian paramilitary troops and Georgian Interior Ministry (MVD) units and paramilitaries. South Ossetia declared its independence from Georgia. In turn, Georgia abolished South Ossetian autonomous status, which existed since the early Soviet years. The Georgian government, led by the president Zviad Gamsakhurdia, responded by sending in army and paramilitary units, in an attempt to restore its control of the region.

On the night of 5 January 1991, 6,000 armed Georgians entered Tskhinvali. After fierce street fighting, the Georgian forces were repelled and driven out of Tshkinvali by South Ossetian troops.

As a result of the war, approximately 100,000 ethnic Ossetians fled from the South Ossetian A.O. and Georgia proper, and 23,000 ethnic Georgians fled from the South Ossetian A.O. into ethnically Georgian areas. 100 villages were reportedly destroyed in South Ossetia. Additionally, the North Ossetia-Georgian border went largely uncontrolled, providing an almost unhindered access point for weapons, fighters, and ammunition in both directions.

A deputy to the North Ossetian Supreme Soviet explained, "When the war began in South Ossetia (Georgia), there were thousands of refugees....Naturally, those Ossetian refugees from South Ossetia and from Georgia who fled here wanted to kick out Georgians living here. There are 15,000 Georgians living here, just in Vladikavkaz...We stopped this; no one fled".

Reactions

 The Australian paper The Age quoted Major-General Vyacheslav Borisov, the commander in the Russian-occupied city of Gori in their description of the circumstances: "There is growing evidence of looting and "ethnic cleansing" in villages in the area of conflict between Russia and Georgia. The attacks — some witnessed by reporters or documented by a human rights group — include stealing, the burning of homes and possibly killings. Some are ethnically motivated, while at least some of the looting appears to be the work of opportunistic profiteers. The identities of the attackers vary, but a pattern of violence by ethnic Ossetians against ethnic Georgians is emerging and has been confirmed by some Russian authorities. "Now Ossetians are running around and killing poor Georgians in their enclaves," said Major-General Vyacheslav Borisov, the commander in the Russian-occupied city of Gori."
 The Norwegian Helsinki Committee, in cooperation with three other human rights organisations, conducted an investigation which concluded that ethnic cleansing continues in the de facto border region between Georgia and South Ossetia. "The Human rights monitors found evidence of the burning of houses, attacks on civilians and forced displacement of the Georgian population as late as Friday 17 October. The material collected describes 16 alleged cases of killings of civilians (excluding deaths resulting from crossfire, bombing and shelling at the time of large scale military operations, and accidents with unexploded ordnance), in areas controlled by Russian forces, many of which seems to be instances of summarily executions.".
Human Rights Watch: "Instead of protecting civilians, Russian forces allowed South Ossetian forces who followed in their path to engage in wanton and wide-scale pillage and burning of Georgian homes and to kill, beat, rape, and threaten civilians," said Denber. "Such deliberate attacks are war crimes, and if committed as part of a widespread or systematic pattern, they may be prosecuted as a crime against humanity." According to the HRW, 15,000 of 17,500 Georgians left South Ossetia prior to the arrival of the Russian soldiers.

According to the Human Rights Watch's January 2009 report on the war in Georgia: "[HRW's] observations on the ground and dozens of interviews conducted led us to conclude that the South Ossetian forces sought to ethnically cleanse this set of Georgian villages: that is, the destruction of the homes in these villages was deliberate, systematic, and carried out on the basis of the ethnic and imputed political affiliations of the residents of these villages, with the express purpose of forcing those who remained to leave and ensuring that no former residents would return... [In undisputed Georgian territory] Beginning with the Russian occupation of Georgia and through the end of September, Ossetian forces, often in the presence of Russian forces, conducted a campaign of deliberate violence against civilians, burning and looting their homes on a wide scale, and committing execution-style killings, rape, abductions, and countless beatings."

South Ossetian position
The policy of ethnic cleansing was also affirmed by the president of South Ossetia, Eduard Kokoity, who in his interview of 15 August 2008 given to the Russian publication Kommersant, on the question "Will Georgian civilians be allowed to return?" gave the following answer: "We do not intend to let anybody in here anymore".

The Economist also quoted a South Ossetian intelligence officer as follows: "We burned these houses. We want to make sure that they [the Georgians] can't come back, because if they do come back, this will be a Georgian enclave again and this should not happen".

International courts
On 21 January 2021, the European Court of Human Rights (ECHR) ruling found the Russian and South Ossetian forces guilty of preventing the return of thousands of forcibly displaced Georgians to their territory in South Ossetia.

The International Criminal Court concluded its investigation in the Situation in Georgia in December 2022, delivering arrest warrants for three de facto South Ossetian officials believed to bear responsibility for war crimes committed during the 2008 war — Mikhail Mindzaev, Gamlet Guchmazov and David Sanakoev, respectively, holding the positions of Minister of Internal Affairs, head of a detention centre in Tskhinvali, and Presidential Representative for Human Rights of South Ossetia, at the relevant time. The fourth suspect, Russian general Vyacheslav Borisov, was not indicted as he had died in 2021.

See also
 Ethnic cleansing of Georgians in Abkhazia
 Humanitarian impact of the 2008 South Ossetia war

References

Anti-Georgian sentiment
Georgians in South Ossetia
Georgians in South Ossetia
2008 in Georgia (country)
2008 in South Ossetia
Russo-Georgian War
Russian war crimes in Georgia (country)
Crimes against humanity